Macclesfield is a constituency in Cheshire currently represented in the House of Commons of the UK Parliament since 2010 by David Rutley, a Conservative.

History 1832-85 
Macclesfield was created as a two-member parliamentary borough by the Reform Act 1832. This continued until 1880 when, after problems at the general election that year, it was decided to declare the election void and suspend the writ of election (so no by-election could take place).

In September 1880 a Royal Commission was appointed to investigate further. A report of March 1881 confirmed the allegations of corruption. As a result, the borough constituency was disenfranchised, taking effect on 25 June 1885, and the town was absorbed into the East Cheshire constituency.

Boundaries since 1885 

In 1885, under the Redistribution of Seats Act 1885, the Macclesfield constituency was recreated with extended boundaries as one of eight new divisions of the county of Cheshire. From the 1885 general election it has continued to elect one MP until the present day.

1885–1918: The Municipal Boroughs of Congleton and Macclesfield, and parts of the Sessional Divisions of Northwich and Prestbury.

1918–1950: The Municipal Boroughs of Congleton and Macclesfield, the Urban Districts of Bredbury and Romiley, Buglawton, Compstall, Marple, and Yeardsley-cum-Whaley, the Rural District of Disley, in the Rural District of Congleton the civil parishes of Hulme Walfield and Newbold Astbury, and part of the Rural District of Macclesfield.

Expanded along the eastern border of Cheshire, gaining Disley and Yeardley-cum-Whaley from Knutsford, and Bredbury and Romiley, Compstall and Marple from the abolished constituency of Hyde.

1950–1974: The Municipal Boroughs of Congleton and Macclesfield, the Urban District of Bollington, and the Rural Districts of Disley and Macclesfield.

The Urban Districts of Bredbury and Romiley (which had absorbed most of Compstall), and Marple were included in the new constituency of Cheadle. Bollington and the part of the Rural District of Macclesfield not previously in the constituency, including Poynton, were transferred from Knutsford. The Urban District of Yeardsley-cum-Whaley had been abolished and partly absorbed into Disley, and Buglawton had been absorbed into the Municipal Borough of Congleton. Other minor changes.

1974–1983: The Municipal Boroughs of Congleton and Macclesfield, the Urban Districts of Alderley Edge and Bollington, and the Rural Districts of Disley and Macclesfield.

Alderley Edge transferred from Knutsford.

From 1 April 1974 until the next boundary review came into effect for the 1983 general election, the constituency comprised parts of the newly formed Boroughs of Congleton and Macclesfield, but its boundaries were unchanged.

1983–1997: The Borough of Macclesfield wards of Alderley Edge, Bollington Central, Bollington East, Bollington West, Disley, Gawsworth, Henbury, Macclesfield Central, Macclesfield East, Macclesfield North East, Macclesfield North West, Macclesfield South, Macclesfield West, Nether Alderley, Poynton Central, Poynton East, Poynton West, Prestbury, Rainow, and Sutton.

The parts of the Borough of Congleton (comprising the former Municipal Borough thereof) were included in the new constituency of Congleton. Otherwise, only marginal changes to the boundaries.

1997–2010: The Borough of Macclesfield wards of Bollington Central, Bollington East, Bollington West, Disley, Gawsworth, Henbury, Macclesfield Central, Macclesfield East, Macclesfield North East, Macclesfield North West, Macclesfield South, Macclesfield West, Poynton Central, Poynton East, Poynton West, Prestbury, Rainow, and Sutton.

2010–present: The Parliamentary Constituencies (England) Order 2007 defined the boundaries as:

The Borough of Macclesfield wards of Bollington Central, Bollington East, Bollington West, Disley & Lyme Handley, Gawsworth, Henbury, Macclesfield Bollinbrook, Macclesfield Broken Cross, Macclesfield Central, Macclesfield East, Macclesfield Hurdsfield, Macclesfield Ivy, Macclesfield Ryles, Macclesfield South, Macclesfield Tytherington, Macclesfield West, Poynton Central, Poynton East, Poynton West, Prestbury, Rainow, and Sutton.

Minor changes due to revision of ward boundaries.

However, before the new boundaries came into force for the 2010 election, the Borough of Macclesfield was abolished on 1 April 2009, becoming part of the new unitary authority of Cheshire East.  Consequently, the constituency's boundaries are currently:

The Cheshire East Borough wards of Bollington, Broken Cross & Upton, Disley, Gawsworth, Macclesfield Central, Macclesfield East, Macclesfield Hurdsfield, Macclesfield South, Macclesfield Tytherington, Macclesfield West & Ivy, Poynton East & Pott Shrigley, Poynton West & Adlington, Prestbury, and Sutton.

The constituency currently covers the north-eastern part of the Cheshire East unitary authority, including the town of Macclesfield itself and the area surrounding it, such as Bollington and Prestbury, as well as Disley and Poynton.  Much of the constituency is commuter territory for Manchester.

Recent political history 
Macclesfield has long been considered to be a safe seat for the Conservative Party, having been held by them since the 1918 general election.

Most areas in the towns of Macclesfield itself and Bollington have leant towards Labour or the Liberal Democrats and previously the Liberal Party; Prestbury, Gawsworth, Poynton and the swathe of countryside that makes up a significant proportion of the seat have historically returned large majorities for the Conservative Party.

2017–present
Since the 2017 general election, however, the constituency has been a target seat for Labour, after they achieved a 7% swing in that election.

In the 2019 local elections, the Conservatives lost every councillor they had in the town of Macclesfield, with Labour making significant gains in areas they had never won before. The Conservatives largely maintained their vote outside Macclesfield, except in Bollington and Disley, in which they came third behind Labour and Independent candidates.

The 2019 General Election saw a 2% swing to the Conservative Party, the national average swing was 4.5%.

EU Referendum
During the 2016 EU membership referendum, the constituency voted narrowly to remain in the EU, despite the UK overall voting to leave. Around 7,000 Maxonians subsequently signed a petition calling for a second referendum although it is estimated that 47% of the Macclesfield electorate voted to leave.

Members of Parliament

Long-serving member (1971–2010) 
Sir Nicholas Winterton who had been the Conservative MP, was first elected at a by-election in 1971 and held the seat until his retirement as an MP on the dissolution of the House of Commons in April 2010. Both Sir Nicholas and his wife Ann, Conservative MP for Congleton from 1983 to 2010, announced that they would not be candidates at the general election. On 17 October 2009 David Rutley was selected as the Conservative candidate by way of an open primary organised by the party and on 6 May 2010 was elected MP with an increased majority.

MPs 1832–1880: Macclesfield Parliamentary Borough 
From 1832 until 1880, Macclesfield was represented by two members of parliament.

MPs since 1885: Macclesfield county constituency 
 The Macclesfield constituency was recreated in 1885, and subsequently has elected one MP only.

Elections 1900-Present

Elections in the 2010s

Elections in the 2000s

Elections in the 1990s

Elections in the 1980s

Elections in the 1970s

Elections in the 1960s

Elections in the 1950s

Election in the 1940s

Elections in the 1930s
General Election 1939–40:
Another General Election was required to take place before the end of 1940. The political parties had been making preparations for an election to take place from 1939 and by the end of this year, the following candidates had been selected; 
Conservative: W. Garfield Weston
Labour: C. T. Douthwaite
Liberal: Edward Anthony Brooke Fletcher

Elections in the 1920s

Elections in the 1910s 

General Election 1914–15:

Another General Election was required to take place before the end of 1915. The political parties had been making preparations for an election to take place and by July 1914, the following candidates had been selected; 
Liberal: William Brocklehurst
Unionist:

Elections in the 1900s

Elections 1832-1895

The writ was suspended after an investigation found extensive bribery and the 1880 election was void. Macclesfield was incorporated into Cheshire East from 25 June 1885, before being re-established for the 1885 election.

 

 

 

 

 

 

 Huggins resigned towards the close of the poll.

See also 

 List of parliamentary constituencies in Cheshire
History of parliamentary constituencies and boundaries in Cheshire

Notes

References

Macclesfield
Parliamentary constituencies in Cheshire
Constituencies of the Parliament of the United Kingdom established in 1832
1880 disestablishments in the United Kingdom
Constituencies of the Parliament of the United Kingdom established in 1885
Parliamentary constituencies disenfranchised for corruption